Brittas Bay in County Wicklow, Ireland is a  stretch of beach on the Irish Sea coast, about  south of Wicklow.  The beach and associated dunes are very popular with Dubliners and are one of the most frequented beaches by residents of the capital during the summer.

Geography

Brittas Bay is in the civil parish of Dunganstown in the barony of Arklow on the southern coast of County Wicklow.

History
There was a Christian settlement in nearby Three-Mile-Water prior to St Patrick's arrival in Ireland. This settlement was presided over by a Roman prelate Palladius, who was sent by Cellestine to Ireland in 431 AD. He was assisted by two monks named Sylvester and Solinus. Later St Baoithin ruled over a monastery in the area and one of his pupils was St Kevin who founded the Christian settlement in Glendalough.

A 17th Century smuggler and pirate Captain Jack White operated from Jack's Hole, a secluded cove where he intercepted goods from British merchant ships and imported goods from France to the annoyance of Crown authorities who were thus deprived of customs revenue.

Until the end of September 2012 Bus Éireann route 2 used to stop at Jack White's Cross numerous times each day. There was considerable public dissatisfaction with the decision to terminate the route. The stop at Jack White's Cross was subsequently reinstated in the route 2 timetable from 25 August 2013.

Landmarks
Several caravan parks are in the vicinity including Staunton's Caravan Site, O'Drischoll's Caravan Park and Brittas Bay Park. The European Club golf club is to the south near the hamlet of Ardanary on Mizen Head. Dunganstown Castle lies to the northeast of Brittas Bay.

Popular Culture

Brittas Bay has been used as a filming location for the 2002 film adaptation of The Count of Monte Cristo as well as History Channel's Vikings.

References 

Beaches of County Wicklow
Tourist attractions in County Wicklow
Bays of the Republic of Ireland